Karl Neumer (23 February 1887 – 16 May 1984) was a German track cyclist. At the 1908 Olympics he won a bronze medal in the individual sprint and a silver in the team pursuit. He also competed in the 5000 metres race, but was eliminated in the first round.

Neumer held the national sprint title in 1907–1910. In 1912 he raced professionally, but with little success. He then ran a vegetable shop in Dresden, which was destroyed by bombing in 1945. His 1908 bicycle was one of the first exhibits at the Leipzig Sports Museum. Before his death in 1984, Neumer was the oldest living German Olympic medalist.

References

1887 births
1984 deaths
People from Sächsische Schweiz-Osterzgebirge
People from the Kingdom of Saxony
German male cyclists
German track cyclists
Cyclists from Saxony
Olympic cyclists of Germany
Cyclists at the 1908 Summer Olympics
Olympic silver medalists for Germany
Olympic bronze medalists for Germany
Olympic medalists in cycling
Medalists at the 1908 Summer Olympics